Johannes Pettersen Løkke (28 January 1895 – 14 March 1988) was a Norwegian politician for the Labour Party.

He was born in Kristiania.

He was elected to the Norwegian Parliament from the Market towns of Telemark and Aust-Agder counties in 1950, but was not re-elected in 1954. Instead he served the next term in the position of deputy representative.

Løkke was a member of Notodden city council from 1937 to 1969, serving as mayor in the periods 1945–1947, 1947–1951 and 1951–1954.

References

1895 births
1988 deaths
Labour Party (Norway) politicians
Members of the Storting
20th-century Norwegian politicians